SS Great Western of 1838, was a wooden-hulled paddle-wheel steamship with sails the first steamship purpose-built for crossing the Atlantic, and the initial unit of the Great Western Steamship Company. Designed by British civil engineer Isambard Kingdom Brunel, Great Western proved satisfactory in service and was the model for all successful wooden Atlantic paddle-steamers. She was capable of making record Blue Riband voyages as late as 1843. Great Western worked to New York for 8 years until her owners went out of business. She was sold to the Royal Mail Steam Packet Company and was scrapped in 1856 after serving as a troop ship during the Crimean War.

Development and design

In 1836, Isambard Brunel, his friend Thomas Guppy and a group of Bristol investors formed the Great Western Steamship Company to build a line of steamships for the Bristol-New York route. The idea of regular scheduled transatlantic service was under discussion by several groups and the rival British and American Steam Navigation Company was established at the same time.  Great Western's design sparked controversy from critics that contended that she was too big. The principle that Brunel understood was that the carrying capacity of a ship increases as the cube of its dimensions, whilst the water resistance only increases as the square of its dimensions. This meant that large ships were more fuel efficient, something very important for long voyages across the Atlantic.

Great Western was an iron-strapped, wooden, side-wheel paddle steamer, with four masts to hoist the auxiliary sails. The sails were not just to provide auxiliary propulsion, but also were used in rough seas to keep the ship on an even keel and ensure that both paddle wheels remained in the water, driving the ship in a straight line. The hull was built of oak (one source says Dantzic pine) by traditional methods. She was the largest steamship for one year, until the British and American's British Queen went into service. Built at the shipyard of Patterson & Mercer in Bristol, Great Western was launched on 19 July 1837 and then sailed to London, where she was fitted with two side-lever steam engines from the firm of Maudslay, Sons and Field, producing 750 indicated horsepower between them.

Service history

On 31 March 1838, Great Western sailed for Avonmouth (Bristol) to start her maiden voyage to New York. Before reaching Avonmouth, a fire broke out in the engine room. During the confusion Brunel fell , and was injured. The fire was extinguished, and the damage to the ship was minimal, but Brunel had to be put ashore at Canvey Island. As a result of the accident, more than 50 passengers cancelled their bookings for the Bristol-New York voyage and when Great Western finally departed Avonmouth, only 7 passengers were aboard.

Construction of the rival British and American's first ship was delayed, and the company chartered Sirius to beat Great Western to New York.  Sirius was a  Irish Sea steam packet on the London – Cork route, and had part of her passenger accommodation removed to make room for extra coal bunkers. She left London three days before Great Western, refuelled at Cork, and departed for New York on 4 April. Great Western was delayed in Bristol because of the fire and did not depart until 8 April.

Even with a four-day head start, Sirius only narrowly beat Great Western, arriving on 22 April. When coal ran low, the crew burned 5 drums of resin. Great Western arrived the following day, with 200 tons of coal still aboard.

Great Western proved completely satisfactory in service and influenced the design of other Atlantic paddlers. Even Cunard's Britannia was a reduced version of Great Western. During 1838–1840, Great Western averaged 16 days, 0 hours (7.95 knots) westward to New York and 13 days, 9 hours (9.55 knots) home. In 1838, the company paid a 9% dividend, but that was to be the firm's only dividend because of the expense of building the company's next ship. After the collapse of British and American, Great Western alternated between Avonmouth and Liverpool, before abandoning Avonmouth entirely in 1843. The ship remained profitable even though she lacked a running mate because of the protracted construction on Great Britain. In 1843, Great Western's receipts were £33,400 against expenditures of £25,600.

The company's fortunes improved in 1845 when Great Britain entered service. However, in September 1846 Great Britain ran ashore because of a navigational error and was not expected to survive the winter. The directors suspended all sailings of Great Western and went out of business. Great Western had completed 45 crossings for her owners in eight years. In 1847 she was sold to the Royal Mail Steam Packet Company and used on the West Indies run. Southampton became her new home port from where she made 14 voyages to the West Indies between 1847 and 1853, before being put on the South America run and made another 9 voyages to Rio de Janeiro between 1853 and 1855. On the South America run she called at Lisbon, Madeira, Teneriffe, St Vincents, Pernambuco and Bahia on the way to Rio and then in reverse on the return passage.

The Great Western was then laid up at Southampton before being taken into government service as 'Transport No. 6'. She served as a troopship in the Crimean War in 1856, carrying soldiers between the UK, Gibraltar, Malta, and the Crimean Peninsula. In August 1856 she was sold for scrapping and was broken up at Castles' Yard, Millbank on the Thames.

See also
 SS Great Britain
 SS Great Eastern
List of world's largest wooden ships

References

External links

Houghton-Mifflin "Ships of the World"
Maritimequest Great Western photo gallery

1837 ships
Blue Riband holders
Ships built in Bristol
Steamships
Troop ships of the United Kingdom
Victorian-era merchant ships of the United Kingdom
Ships designed by Isambard Kingdom Brunel
1837 establishments in England
Maritime incidents in November 1851